The history of Jews in Jordan can be traced back to Biblical times. Presently, there are no legal restrictions on Jews in Jordan, and they are permitted to own property and conduct business in the country, but in 2006 there were reported to be no Jewish citizens of Jordan, nor any synagogues or other Jewish institutions.

Israelite tribes

According to the Hebrew Bible, three of the ancient Israelite tribes were allocated lands on the east side of the Jordan River valley, in the territory of present-day Jordan. They were the tribes of Reuben, Gad and Manasseh. These tribes were members of the Northern Kingdom of Israel until the kingdom was conquered by Assyria in c. 723 BCE and the population deported.

A nation related to the Israelites, the Edomites (Idumaeans) resided in present-day southern Jordan, between the Dead Sea and the Gulf of Aqaba. 

The Hasmonean official Antipater the Idumaean was of Idumean origin. He was the progenitor of the Herodian dynasty that ruled Judea after the Roman conquest. When Herod the Great became king, Idumaea was ruled for him by a series of governors, among whom were his brother Joseph Antipater and his brother-in-law Costobarus.

Immediately before the siege of Jerusalem by Titus, 20,000 Idumaeans, under the leadership of John, Simeon, Phinehas, and Jacob, appeared before Jerusalem to fight on behalf of the zealots who were besieged in the Second Temple.

After the Jewish-Roman wars, the Idumaean people ceased to be mentioned in history.

Roman era
Roman rule in the region began in 63 BCE, when the general Pompey declared Judea a Roman protectorate. Over the years, Roman power over the Judean kingdom increased. Among the voices of opposition were John the Baptist, whose severed head was allegedly presented at the fortress of Machaerus to Herod. In 66 CE, the forces behind the First Jewish Revolt took control of Machaerus, Beth-nimrah, and Livias. The rebels held Machaerus until 72 CE, when a siege secured the defeat of local Jewish forces.

At the end of the Bar Kochba revolt of 132-135 CE and the destruction of Judea, the Romans joined the province of Judea (which already included Samaria) to Galilee to form a new province, which they called Syria Palaestina. Following the Roman conquest, the lands on both sides of the Jordan River with its Jewish inhabitants came under the control and decrees of subsequent Roman emperors and Arab caliphates.

A series of excavation surveys conducted in Zoara in 1986-1996 uncovered gravestones inscribed in Aramaic, suggesting that they belong to Jewish burials. Of these, two inscriptions reveal the origins of the deceased as being Jews that hailed from Ḥimyar (now Yemen) and are funerary inscriptions dating back to 470 and 477 A.D., written in the combined Hebrew, Aramaic and Sabaean scripts. These gravestones have all been traced back to the fourth-fifth centuries A.D., when Zoara was an important Jewish center. Unusually, Christians and Jews were buried in the same cemetery.

Over the centuries, the Jewish population within present-day Jordan gradually declined, until no Jews were left.

British Mandate
The British Balfour Declaration endorsed the idea of a Jewish homeland in Palestine, though its borders were not defined. Boundaries for a British Mandate for Palestine were proposed by the World Zionist Organization to the Paris Peace Conference of 1919:

"The fertile plains east of the Jordan, since the earliest Biblical times, have been linked economically and politically with the land west of the Jordan. The country which is now very sparsely populated, in Roman times supported a great population. It could now serve admirably for colonisation on a large scale. A just regard for the economic needs of Palestine and Arabia demands that free access to the Hedjaz Railway throughout its length be accorded both Governments."

Notwithstanding the wishes of the WZO, the British administration from as early as 1917 treated territory east of the Jordan River, known as Transjordan, separately, and saw it as a separate future state. A formal restriction of the Jewish homeland to west of the Jordan was announced at the Cairo conference in March 1921, and a new article was added to the draft mandate text allowing the British government to administer Transjordan separately. The mandate was approved by the League of Nations in July 1922, and in September 1922 the League approved a memorandum spelling out in detail the exclusion of Transjordan from the Jewish homeland provisions.

The only formally approved presence of Jews in Transjordan was in the late 1920s. In 1927, Pinchas Rutenberg, founder of the Palestine Electric Company, signed an agreement with the Emir of Transjordan Abdullah I to build a hydroelectric power station on Transjordan territory. Construction of the Naharayim hydroelectric power plant began in 1928. Tel Or was built near the power plant to house the permanent employees and their families. Tel Or was settled in 1930 and was the only Jewish village in Transjordan at the time. Residents also farmed thousands of dunams of land and sold some of the produce at a company workers’ supermarket in Haifa. The town lasted until its depopulation in 1948 during the Arab-Israeli War, when it was overrun by Iraqi and Transjordanian forces and destroyed.

Jordan relations with Israel
 
Jordan was not a member of the United Nations when the vote on the United Nations Partition Plan for Palestine of 1947 was taken, but following the establishment of the state of Israel on 14 May 1948, Jordan, then known as Transjordan, was one of the Arab League countries that immediately attacked the new country, precipitating the 1948 Arab-Israeli War. By war’s end, it had control of the West Bank and East Jerusalem (including the Old City), and expelled those Jews who remained in the Old City of Jerusalem. An Arab commander remarked: "For the first time in 1,000 years not a single Jew remains in the Jewish Quarter. Not a single building remains intact. This makes the Jews' return here impossible." The Hurva Synagogue, originally built in 1701, was blown up by the Jordanian Arab Legion.

In 1950 Jordan annexed the West Bank and East Jerusalem, and in 1954 granted Jordanian nationality to its non-Jewish residents who had been Palestinian nationals before 15 May 1948. During the nineteen years of Jordanian rule in the West Bank, a third of the Jewish Quarter's buildings were demolished. According to a complaint Israel made to the United Nations, all but one of the thirty-five Jewish houses of worship in the Old City were destroyed. The synagogues were razed or pillaged and stripped and their interiors used as hen-houses or stables.

Jordan lost control of the West Bank during the 1967 Six-Day War, but did not relinquished its claim to the West Bank until 1988, and in 1994 signed the Israel-Jordan Treaty of Peace. The treaty did not change the status of Jews in Jordan, and in 2006 it was reported that there were no Jewish citizens of Jordan, nor any synagogues or other Jewish institutions. Nevertheless, the government does recognize Judaism as a religion and does not impose restrictions on Jews, and Jews are permitted to own property and conduct business in the country, though these may be subject to Jordanian nationality requirements.

Trade and tourism
Jordan has welcomed a number of Israeli companies to open plants in Jordan. Israeli tourists, as well as Jewish citizens of other countries, visit Jordan. In the year following the 1994 Israel-Jordan treaty, some 60,000 to 80,000 Israeli tourists visited Jordan. Expectations of closer relations between the countries led to a proposal to open a kosher restaurant in Amman. With a loss of Arab clientele, failure to secure kosher certification, and lack of interest among tourists, the enterprise failed.

Following the Second Intifada (2000–2005), Israeli tourism to Jordan declined greatly, as a result of anti-Israeli agitation among a wide segment of the population. In August 2008, Jordanian border officials turned back a group of Israeli tourists who were carrying Jewish religious items. According to the guards, the items posed a "security risk," even if used within the privacy of a hotel, and could not be brought into the country. In response, the tour group chose not to enter Jordan. The apparent ban on Jewish worship in Jordan was again enforced in August 2019, after a group of Israeli tourists shared a video of themselves dancing with a Torah scroll at the Tomb of Aaron on Mount Hor near Petra. Jordanian authorities confiscated Jewish religious items from the group and closed the summit to foreign tour groups that do not have permission to visit from the Awqaf Ministry.

Part of the 1994 peace treaty restored political control of the 500-acre Tzofar farm fields in the Arava valley to Jordan, but Israel rented the land so that Israeli workers from the moshav could continue to cultivate it. This area is not subject to customs or immigration legislation. The treaty preserves this arrangement for 25 years, with automatic renewal unless either country terminates the arrangement. The 25-year lease will end in October 2019, after the Jordanian government gave the requisite one-year notice.

The Island of Peace at the confluence of the Yarmouk and Jordan Rivers operated under a similar agreement allowing Israeli usage under Jordanian sovereignty. This lease ended on November 10, 2019.

Jews in the Arabian Peninsula

History of the Jews in Iraq
History of the Jews in Bahrain
History of the Jews in Kuwait
History of the Jews in Oman
History of the Jews in Qatar
History of the Jews in Saudi Arabia
History of the Jews in the United Arab Emirates
Yemenite Jews

See also
Abrahamic religion
Arab Jews
Arab states of the Persian Gulf
Babylonian captivity
History of the Jews in the Arabian Peninsula
Jewish exodus from Arab lands
Jews outside Europe under Nazi occupation
List of Jews from the Arab World
Mizrahi Jews
Transjordan (Bible)
Israel–Jordan relations
Island of Peace massacre

References

 
Jordan
Israel–Jordan relations